Gniby is an arrondissement of Kaffrine Department in Kaffrine Region in Senegal.

In 2023, 40 people were killed in a bus crash.

References 

Arrondissements of Senegal